Kristian Barstad Dysthe (born 16 September 1937) is a Norwegian mathematician.

He took the cand.real. degree at the University of Bergen in 1962, and the dr.philos. degree in 1972. He became professor in applied mathematics at the University of Tromsø in 1972, and at the University of Bergen from 1992 to retirement in 2007. He has been a visiting scholar at the University of Cambridge, the Scripps Institution of Oceanography and the Stanford University. He is a member of the Norwegian Academy of Science and Letters.

References

1937 births
Living people
Norwegian mathematicians
University of Bergen alumni
Academic staff of the University of Tromsø
Academic staff of the University of Bergen
Members of the Norwegian Academy of Science and Letters